"The Judas Kiss" is a song by American heavy metal band Metallica, the fourth single taken from their ninth studio album, Death Magnetic.

On September 8, 2008, it was made available for streaming on the band's official website, as well as a download (for Platinum Members only) from the Death Magnetic website Mission: Metallica. It has since been made available for purchase as a digital single in the iTunes Store. Part of the beginning to "The Judas Kiss" was also featured in an online video on the official website and Mission: Metallica revealing the album's title. The first live performance of the song was at the Trent FM Arena in Nottingham, England, on February 25, 2009, as part of their opening gig in the European leg of their World Magnetic Tour.

Track listing
Digital download
 "The Judas Kiss" – 8:01

Charts

Personnel

Metallica
 James Hetfield – vocals, rhythm guitar
 Lars Ulrich – drums
 Kirk Hammett – lead guitar
 Robert Trujillo – bass

Additional personnel
 Rick Rubin – producer
 Ted Jensen – mastering
 Greg Fidelman – mixing

References

2008 singles
Metallica songs
Songs written by James Hetfield
Songs written by Lars Ulrich
Songs written by Kirk Hammett
Songs written by Robert Trujillo
Song recordings produced by Rick Rubin
2008 songs
Warner Records singles